Gustav Tschermak von Seysenegg (19 April 1836 – 24 May 1927) was an Austrian mineralogist.

Biography
He was born in Litovel, Moravia, and studied at the University of Vienna, where he obtained a teaching degree. He studied mineralogy at Heidelberg and Tübingen and obtained a PhD. He returned to Vienna as a lecturer in mineralogy and chemistry and, in 1862 was appointed second vice curator of the Imperial Mineralogical Cabinet, becoming director in 1868. He resigned as director in 1877. He was also professor of petrography at the University of Vienna. He was appointed professor in 1873 and a member of the Imperial Academy of Sciences, a member of the American Philosophical Society in 1882, and a member of the Royal Swedish Academy of Sciences in 1905. He died in 1927, aged 91.

Work
He did useful work on many minerals and on meteorites. The mineral tschermakite is named in his honour.  In 1871 he established the Mineralogische Mitteilungen (Mineralogical Reports), published after 1878 as the Mineralogische und petrographische Mitteilungen (Mineralogical and Petrographical Reports). His publications include:
 Die Porphyrgesteine Oesterreichs (1869)
 Die mikroskopische Beschaffenheit der Meteoriten (1883)
 Lehrbuch der Mineralogie (1884; 5th ed. 1897) Digital 5th edition by the University and State Library Düsseldorf

Family
He had two sons, Armin von Tschermak-Seysenegg, professor of physiology, and Erich von Tschermak-Seysenegg, a botanist, who were one of the re-discoverers of Mendel's laws of genetics.

See also
 Glossary of meteoritics

References

 
 

1836 births
1927 deaths
People from Litovel
Moravian-German people
Austrian mineralogists
Edlers of Austria
Austrian people of Moravian-German descent
Rectors of universities in Austria
University of Vienna alumni
Academic staff of the University of Vienna
Heidelberg University alumni
University of Tübingen alumni
Members of the Royal Swedish Academy of Sciences
Meteorite researchers
Burials at Döbling Cemetery